Rich Boy is the eponymous debut studio album by American rapper Rich Boy, released on March 13, 2007 through Interscope and Zone 4. The album was supported by Rich Boy's smash hit debut single, "Throw Some D's" produced by and featuring Polow da Don, which peaked at number six on the Billboard Hot 100. The remix of "Throw Some D's" appears on this album and features Nelly, Jim Jones, Andre 3000, The Game, Murphy Lee and Lil Jon.

The album debuted and peaked at number 3 on the Billboard 200 with 112,000 copies sold in its first week. By the week of June 17, 2007, 332,000 copies had been sold.

Critical reception

Simon Vozick-Levinson of Entertainment Weekly gave praise to Rich's vocal delivery and Polow's "intricate, varied, and unfailingly catchy instrumentals" for masking the "occasional lapses into generic macho posturing" throughout the lyrics. Jonathan Ringen of Rolling Stone noted how the record follows the Young Jeezy template ("a hypnotic flow, vivid details, synth-soaked beats") but with a more varied list of topics. He also gave credit to Polow's production, singling out "Boy Looka Here" for being a "menacing banger". Pitchfork contributor Tom Breihan said, "[T]he album's stunning, high-impact production fits it into the recent tradition of epic, monolithic Southern-rap albums like Young Buck's Straight Outta Ca$hville and Young Jeezy's Let's Get It: Thug Motivation 101, but more than those albums, it's the work of one idiosyncratic creative mind. Polow [da Don] is just now finding his voice, and he's got a great career ahead of him. If Rich Boy is lucky, he'll stay along for the ride."

XXLs Paul Cantor credited Rich on "Boy Looka Here" and "Ghetto Rich" for showcasing both his swagger and introspection but felt he falters on "What It Do" and "Lost Girls" when the production either reveals his lyrical flaws or dilutes his given message, concluding that "Sprinkled with a few more moments of clarity, Rich Boy has enough hits to make it worthy of throwin' some cheese on it." J-23 of HipHopDX praised Polow for creating bangers like "Boy Looka Here" and "Touch That Ass" that match Rich's style to perfection but was critical of the latter's rapping talents being exposed by filler tracks, guest artists and producers, concluding that "Rich Boy ends up being a pretty good album, but it probably should have been titled Polow Da Don as he really deserves the bulk of the credit. The album may be good, but a cookie cutter rapper like Rich Boy is going to have less shelf live than his album will."

AllMusic's Andy Kellman commended Rich's unique vocalization and the production, highlighting Brian Kidd's contribution on "Get to Poppin'", but concluded that the album wears thin with stagnant beats and "uninspired variations on the rampant materialism done so effectively on "Throw Some D's."" Steve 'Flash' Juon of RapReviews criticized Rich's "monotonous thuggery delivered with an excessively thick accent" and Polow's production having a "night and day" unevenness throughout the record. PopMatters contributor Gentry Boeckel felt that Polow and Brian Kidd overshadow Rich throughout the album with their contributions instead of helping him craft a unique image, concluding that, "Both as an artist and a persona, Rich Boy lives up to his name, with the best thing one can say about him is that he has a certain get-rich-quick innocence, a certain naive hunger to succeed. Too bad that success depends so much on his collaborators." Reptilia of AbsolutePunk was also critical of Rich's lyricism ruining Polow's catchy beats, concluding that, "Too much of Rich Boy's style is playing up the same "gangsta" stereotypes and not really doing anything to distance his flow and his lack of profound or at least interesting rhyme from anybody else's in the modern rap scene. And unfortunately, the Polow Show doesn't cover those flaws."

Track listing

Charts

Weekly charts

Year-end charts

References

2007 debut albums
Albums produced by Polow da Don
Albums produced by Lil Jon
Interscope Records albums
Rich Boy albums